Strength is a Major Arcana tarot card, and is numbered either XI or VIII, depending on the deck. Historically it was called Fortitude, and in the Thoth Tarot deck it is called Lust. This card is used in game playing as well as in divination.

Description 

The design of this card is fairly constant across tarot decks. The key characters are that of a woman and a lion, with the woman leaning over the lion. Many cards, including that of the Rider–Waite–Smith deck, have the woman clasping the lion's jaws. Some feature an Infinity symbol hovering over the woman's head. Other decks have the woman sitting upon the lion, or merely with one hand upon it. Some decks feature just one of the characters; flowers are often presented on this card.

According to Eden Gray, the lemniscate above her represents enlightenment and spiritual powers, whereas the lion represents animal passions and earthly cravings.

History 
The Strength card was originally named Fortitude, and accompanies two of the other cardinal virtues in the Major Arcana: Temperance and Justice. 

The older decks had two competing symbolisms: one featured a woman holding or breaking a stone pillar, and the other featured a person, either male or female, subduing a lion. This Tarocchi del Mantegna card (image, right), made in Ferrara around 1470, illustrates both. The modern woman-and-lion symbolism most likely evolved from a merging of the two earlier ones.

Numbering

Strength is traditionally the eleventh card and Justice the eighth, but the influential Rider–Waite–Smith deck switched the position of these two cards in order to make them a better fit with the astrological correspondences worked out by the Hermetic Order of the Golden Dawn, under which the eighth card is associated with Leo and the eleventh with Libra. This switch was originally suggested in the mysterious Cipher Manuscripts which formed the basis for the Golden Dawn's teachings regarding tarot and other subjects. Today many divinatory tarot decks use this numbering, particularly in the English-speaking world.

Interpretation

According to A. E. Waite's 1910 book Pictorial Key to the Tarot, the Strength card carries several divinatory associations:

8. FORTITUDE.—Power, energy, action, courage, magnanimity; also complete success and honours. Reversed: Despotism, abuse of power, weakness, discord, sometimes even disgrace.

Alternative decks 
 The "Flemish Deck" by Vandendorre (c.1750 – 1760) renumbers La Force ("Strength") as XI and La Justice ("Justice") as VIII.
 In the X/1999 tarot version made by CLAMP, The Strength is Yuzuriha Nekoi and her Inugami, Inuki.

In other media 
In the manga JoJo's Bizarre Adventure tarot cards are used to name the character's powers, named 'Stands' one of the Stardust Crusaders, Forever, has  stand named Strength, named after tarot card. This Stand took the form of a massive cargo ship.

References 
 Hajo Banzhaf, Tarot and the Journey of the Hero (2000).
 All works by Joseph Campbell.
Juliette Wood, Folklore 109 (1998):15-24, "The Celtic Tarot and the Secret Tradition: A Study in Modern Legend Making" (1998)

External links 

 "Strength" cards from many decks and articles to "Strength" iconography
 The History of the Strength (Fortitude) Card from The Hermitage
 Strength cards from tarot.org.il (Hebrew)
 Strength from Aeclectic tarot
 Fortitudo - Andreia - Fortitude The Pythagorean tarot

Major Arcana